Maršov u Úpice is a municipality and village in Trutnov District in the Hradec Králové Region of the Czech Republic. It has about 200 inhabitants.

History
The first written mention of Maršov is from 1495.

References

Villages in Trutnov District